Thyagaraja (Telugu: త్యాగరాజ) (4 May 1767 – 6 January 1847), also known as Thyāgayya and in full as Kakarla Thyagabrahmam, was a composer and vocalist of Carnatic music, a form of Indian classical music. Tyagaraja and his contemporaries, Shyama Shastri and Muthuswami Dikshitar, are regarded as the Trinity of Carnatic music. Thyagaraja composed thousands of devotional compositions, most in Telugu and in praise of Lord Rama, many of which remain popular today, the most popular being "Nagumomu". Of special mention are five of his compositions called the Pancharatna Kritis ( "five gems"), which are often sung in programs in his honour, and Utsava Sampradaya Krithis ( Festive ritual compositions), which are often sung to accompany temple rituals.

Tyagaraja lived through the reigns of four kings of the Maratha dynasty – Tulaja II (1763–1787), Amarasimha (1787–1798), Serfoji II (1798–1832) and Sivaji II (1832–1855), although he served none of them.

Personal life and background
Thyāgarāja was born Kakarla Thyagabrahmam in 1767 to a Telugu Vaidiki Mulakanadu Brahmin family in Tiruvarur in present-day Tiruvarur District of Tamil Nadu. There is a school of thought led by musicologist B. M. Sundaram that contests this and proposes Tiruvaiyaru as his birthplace. He is a famous musician and his family name 'Kakarla' indicates that they were originally migrants from the village of the same name in the Cumbum taluk of Prakasam district, Andhra Pradesh. His family belonged to the Smarta tradition and Bharadvaja gotra.  Tyagaraja was the third son of his parents, and Panchanada Brahmam and Panchapakesha Brahmam are his elder brothers. He was named Tyagabrahmam/Tyagaraja after Tyagaraja, the presiding deity of the temple at Thiruvarur, the place of his birth. Tyagaraja's maternal uncle was Giriraja Kavi. Giriraja Kavi was a poet and musician. Giriraja was born in Kakarla village, Cumbum taluk in Prakasam district, Andhra Pradesh. He is believed to have belonged to the Mulakanadu sect. Tyagaraja's maternal grandfather was named Kalahastayya, but was frequently addressed as Veena Kalahastayya as he was a noted veena player. Tyagaraja learned to play the veena in his childhood from Kalahastayya. After Kalahastayya's death Tyagaraja found Naradeeyam, a book related to music. Tyagaraja hero-worshipped the celestial sage Narada; a reference to this is Tyagaraja's krithi Vara Nārada (rāga Vijayaśrī, Ādi tāḷam). Legend has it that a hermit taught him a mantra invoking Narada, and Tyagaraja, meditating on this mantra, received a vision of Narada and was blessed with the book Svarārnavam by the sage. During his last days, Tyagaraja took vows of Sannyasa.

Tyagaraja died on a Pushya Bahula Panchami day, 6 January 1847, at the age of 79. His last composition before his death was Giripai Nelakonna (rāga Sahāna, Ādi tāḷam). He was cremated on the banks of the Kaveri river at Thiruvaiyaru.

Musical career

Tyāgarāja began his musical training at an early age under Sonti Venkata Ramanayya, a music scholar, after the latter heard his singing and was impressed by the child prodigy. Tyagaraja regarded music as a way to experience God's love. His compositions focused on expression, rather than on the technicalities of classical music. He also showed a flair for composing music and, in his teens, composed his first song, "Namo Namo Raghavayya", in the Desika Todi ragam and inscribed it on the walls of the house. His compositions are mainly of a devotional (bhakti) or philosophical nature. His songs feature himself usually either in an appeal to his deity of worship (primarily the Avatar Rama), in musings, in narratives, or giving a message to the public. He has also composed krithis in praise of Krishna, Shiva, Shakti, Ganesha, Muruga, Saraswati, and Hanuman.

Sonti Venkataramanayya informed the king of Thanjavur of Tyagaraja's genius. The king sent an invitation, along with many rich gifts, inviting Tyagaraja to attend the royal court. Tyagaraja, however, was not inclined towards a career at the court, and rejected the invitation outright. He was said to have composed the krithi Nidhi Chala Sukhama (నిధి చాల సుఖమా) ( "Does wealth bring happiness?") on this occasion.
He spent most of his time in Tiruvaiyaru, though there are records of his pilgrimages to Tirumala and Kanchipuram. When he was in Kanchipuram, he met Upanishad Brahmayogin at the Brahmendral Mutt at Kanchipuram.

Tyagaraja, who was immersed in his devotion to Rama and led a spartan way of life, did not take any steps to systematically codify his vast musical output. Rangaramanuja Iyengar, a leading researcher on Carnatic music, in his work Kriti Manimalai, has described the situation prevailing at the time of the death of Tyagaraja.  It is said that a major portion of his incomparable musical work was lost to the world due to natural and man-made calamities. Usually, Tyagaraja used to sing his compositions sitting before deity manifestations of Lord Rama, and his disciples noted down the details of his compositions on palm leaves. After his death, these were in the hands of his disciples, then families descending from the disciples. There was not a definitive edition of Tyagaraja's songs.

The songs he composed in pure Telugu were widespread in their popularity because of the ease with which they could be sung in those days. Musical experts such as Kancheepuram Nayana Pillai, Simizhi Sundaram Iyer and Veenai Dhanammal saw the infinite possibilities for imaginative music inherent in his compositions and they systematically notated the songs available to them. Subsequently, researchers like K. V. Srinivasa Iyengar and Rangaramanuja Iyengar made an enormous effort to contact various teachers and families who possessed the palm leaves. K. V. Srinivasa Iyengar brought out Adi Sangita Ratnavali and Adi Tyagaraja Hridhayam in three volumes. Rangaramanuja Iyengar published Kriti Mani Malai in two volumes. He also composed songs in Sanskrit.

Furthermore, Musiri Subramania Iyer, the doyen of Bhava Sangitam, had a vast collection of books in his library. T. K. Govinda Rao, his disciple, brought out a volume of Tyagaraja's songs in English and Devanagari script. T. S. Parthasarathy, a leading scholar on Tyagaraja, published the text and meaning of Tyagaraja's songs. There are also many less comprehensive publications in Telugu.

About 700 songs remain of the 24,000 songs said to have been composed by him; however, scholars are skeptical about numbers like these, as there is no biographical evidence to support such claims.
In addition to nearly 700 compositions (kritis), Tyagaraja composed two musical plays in Telugu, the Prahalada Bhakti Vijayam and the Nauka Charitam. Prahlada Bhakti Vijayam is in five acts with 45 kritis set in 28 ragas and 138 verses, in different metres in Telugu. Nauka Charitam is a shorter play in one act with 21 kritis set in 13 ragas and 43 verses. The latter is the most popular of Tyagaraja's operas, and is a creation of the composer's own imagination and has no basis in the Bhagavata Purana. Tyagaraja also composed a number of simple devotional pieces appropriate for choral singing.

The 20th-century Indian music critic K. V. Ramachandran wrote: "Tyagaraja is an indefatigable interpreter of the past... but if with one eye he looks backward, with the other he looks forward as well. Like Prajapati, he creates his own media and adores his Rama not alone with jewel-words newly fashioned, but also with jewel-[like]-music newly created. It is this facet of Tyagaraja that distinguishes him from his illustrious contemporaries." In other words, while Tyagaraja's contemporaries were primarily concerned with bringing to audiences the music of the past, Tyagaraja also pioneered new musical concepts at the same time.

Remembrance
Tyagaraja Aradhana, the commemorative music festival is held every year in Thiruvaiyaru in Thanjavur district of Tamil Nadu, during the months of January to February in Tyagaraja's honor. This is a week-long festival of music where various Carnatic musicians from all over the world converge at his resting place. On the Pushya Bahula Panchami, thousands of people and hundreds of Carnatic musicians sing the five Pancharatna Kritis in unison, with the accompaniment of a large bank of accompanists on veenas, violins, flutes, nadasvarams, mridangams and ghatams.

A sports complex in New Delhi, Thyagaraj Sports Complex, was named after him. A crater on the planet Mercury was named after Tyagaraja in 1976.

In popular culture

Films on Tyagaraja (biographical)
Apart from references to his works, using the kirtanas as songs, two films were made on his life. V. Nagayya made a biographical epic on Tyagaraja titled Tyagayya in 1946 which is still treated as a masterpiece of Telugu cinema. In 1981, Bapu–Ramana made Tyagayya with J. V. Somayajulu in the lead role. Another attempt is being made by Singeetam Srinivasa Rao to picturise Tyagaraja's life. Apart from these, Bombay Gnanam made a short film known as Endaro Mahanubavulu on Tyagaraja. The short film was released on 27 February 2021, on the 174th Tyagaraja Aradhana festival.

Raga on Tyagaraja (Musical scale) 
Carnatic kriti 'Sri Ramachandram Bhajami' in raga 'Sri Tyagaraja' created and composed by  named after Saint Tyagaraja sung by Priyadarshini was released on 10 January 2023 at Thyagaraja Samadi during 176th Tyagaraja Aradhana festival

Compositions

The term Pancharatna in Sanskrit means "five gems": The Pancharatnas are known as the five finest gems of Carnatic music. All of the Pancharatnas are set to Adi Talam. So far as Pancharatnas are concerned, a stable text has been handed over by the earlier musicians to the present day. Several musicians have brought out editions of Pancharatnas. However, Veenai Sundaram Iyer's edition is the most detailed and comprehensive. All the compositions of Tyagaraja show the way for the systematic development of the respective ragas. However, in the Pancharatnas, Tyagaraja has given exhaustive treatment as to how to systematically and scientifically develop a raga. The two fundamental conditions that must be satisfied for the systematic development of a raga are the arrangement of the solfa swaras in the natural order of Arohanam and Avarohanam of the Ragas so as to satisfy the sound principles of harmony and continuity. Pancharatnas satisfy these scientific principles. The Pancharatnas are composed in perfect sarvalaghu swaras.

 The first Pancharatna is Jagadaanandakaaraka, in the raga Nata . It is composed in lucid and poetic Sanskrit. It praises Lord Rama as the source of all joy in the universe. Originally there were only six Charanams for the song and when the disciples examined the song it contained ninety names of Lord Rama in mellifluous Sanskrit. The disciples requested Tyagaraja to slightly expand the song by adding two charanas containing eighteen more names of Lord Rama. The saint acceded to the request of the disciples and that is the reason why the song Jagadaanandakaaraka contains three mudras containing the name of Tyagaraja while the other four songs contain only one mudra each. 
 The next is Duduku gala in the raga Gowla set to Aadi Taalam. It is composed in Telugu. In this song, Tyagaraja takes the blame upon himself for all the misdeeds of men and ruminates on who would come and save him from this deplorable situation.
 The third is Saadhinchene in the raga Aarabhi, set to Aadi Taalam. It is composed in Telugu. In this song, Tyagaraja lovingly criticizes Lord Krishna for his cleverness in getting what he wants to be done.
 The fourth song, Kana Kana Ruchiraa is in the raga Varaali set to Aadi Taalam. It is composed in Telugu. In this song, Tyagaraja describes the infinite beauty of Lord Rama.
 The fifth Pancharatna is Endaro Mahaanubhaavulu in Sri Raaga.  It is composed in Telugu. It is said that a great musician from Kerala, Shatkala Govinda Maaraar, visited Tyagaraja and performed before him. Tyagaraja was enchanted with his performance and then was born Endaro Mahanubhavulu, the composition of unparallelled rhythmic beauty in Carnatic music.

Other compositions by Tyagaraja include Saamajavaragamana in Hindolam raagam, Aadamodigaladhe in Chaarukesi raagam, Raaju vedale in Hanumatodi raagam, Ninne nammi naanura in Todi raagam, Kamalapthakula in Brindavana saranga raagam, Ksheera saagara shayana in Devagaandhaari raagam, Maarubalka kunna vemira ma manoramana in Sriranjani raagam, and Nagumomu kanaleni in Aabheri raagam.

See also

 Kancherla Gopanna (Bhadrachala Ramadasu)
 Purandara Dasa
 Annamacharya
 Birmingham Thyagaraja Festival
 Cleveland Thyagaraja Festival

Notes

References

Further reading
 The Spiritual Heritage of Tyagaraja, by C. Ramanujachari with an introduction by Dr. V. Raghavan, Ramakrishna Math, Chennai.
 Tyagaraja Kritigal (in Malayalam) by Prof P. R. Kumara Kerala Varma, Dept of Cultural Publications, Govt of Kerala, Trivandrum, 2000.
 Tyagaraja Kirtanalu (in Telugu) by Smt Dwaraka Parthasarathy and Sri N.C. Parthasarathy, Tagore Publishing House, Kachiguda, Hyderabad, 1995 (Balasaraswati Book Depot, Kurnool).
 Ramachandran, K.V., "The Melakarta: A Critique", The (Madras) Music Academy Platinum Jubilee Commemoration Volume, Vol. I, 1930–1940. (Original publication in the Journal of the Music Academy in 1938.)
 Thyagaraju – Rama Darsanamu (In Telugu) by Dr. Mulukutla Brahmananda Sastry (part of the thesis approved by Andhra University, 1985.)
 Shree Tyagaraja Keerthnai – Parthasarathy TS ( Tamil ) Paperback – 1 January 1970 by KMBC; 2010th edition (1 January 1970), ASIN  :  B00CBQBXMU

External links

 Website dedicated to Tyagaraja
 Thiagaraja A Great Musician – M.S. Ramaswamy Aiyar
 

1767 births
1847 deaths
Carnatic composers
Telugu people
Performers of Hindu music
People from Tiruvarur district
18th-century Indian composers
19th-century Indian composers
Musicians from Tamil Nadu
People from Thanjavur district